Tapio Veli Ilmari Wirkkala (2 June 1915 – 19 May 1985) was a Finnish designer and sculptor, a major figure of post-war design.

Life and work
Wirkkala was born in Hanko in 1915. He attended the Töölö co-educational school in Helsinki. His father, Ilmari Wirkkala, was a cemetery architect, and mother Selma (née Vanhatalo) a wood-carver. His sister Helena Korvenkontio and brother Tauno Wirkkala were also artists.

Wirkkala's work ranges from designs of plastic ketchup bottles and metalware to glass, ceramics and plywood in a range of styles. His success as a glass designer began in 1946 when he designed the Kantarelli vase for Iittala, and the mass-produced Tapio collection was launched in 1954. His range was immense, including glassware, stoneware, jewellery, and furniture for mass production, as well as individual sculptures in several media. He designed commemorative postage stamps for the 1952 Helsinki Olympics, and also designed the Finnish markka banknotes introduced in 1955. In the early 1950s, Wirkkala worked as the artistic director at the Helsinki Central School of Industrial Design.

Among his most famous work have been the designs for the Finlandia vodka bottle (1970–1999) and for Iittala's Ultima Thule set of kitchen glasses. Both glassware items feature a dripping icicle look, and in the case of the Iittala's glassware it is said to have taken thousands of hours to develop a glassblowing technique that would produce the effect.

Wirkkala did much of his initial design work using a traditional Finnish carving knife, the puukko. Wirkkala designed his own version of the knife, the Tapio Wirkkala Puukko, which was manufactured by Hackman Cutlery and marketed by Brookstone in the US in the early-1970s.

Wirkkala died in Helsinki on 19 May 1985 and was buried in the artists' area of the Hietaniemi Cemetery; his wife, Rut Bryk, was later buried next to him.

Awards and distinctions 

 1st and 2nd place, Bill Designing Competition of Bank of Finland 1947
 4 awards, Designing Olympic Stamps 1951, for the 1952 Summer Olympics
 3 Grand Prix at the 9th Milan Triennuial, 1951
 3 Grand Prix, at the 10th Milan Triennuial, 1954
 Lunning Prize 1951
 Order of the Lion of Finland -medal 1955
 1st place, the World Fair in Brussels 1957
 Society of Industrial Artists Medal of the Year 1958
 Grand Prix and Gold Medal, Milan 1960; Silver Medal, Milan 1963
 Domus Golden Obelisk, Milan 1963
 Gold Medal of the President of Italy, Faenza International Ceramics Competition 1963, 1966, 1967, 1969 and 1973
 Premio Internazionale Vicenza 1963, 1966 and 1967
 Honorary Royal Designer of Industry, London 1964
 Honorary Prize, the Finnish Cultural Foundation 1968
 Honorary doctorate, Royal College of Arts, London 1971
 Honorary Member of the Worshipful Company of Goldsmiths, London 1971
  Academy of Finland's honorary title of academician 1972
 Teosto organization's medal for Creative Work 1980
 Prince Eugen Medal, Stockholm 1980

Gallery

References

External links
 Tapio Wirkkala – Rut Bryk Foundation.
 Tapio Wirkkala website.
 Wirkkala biography at Iittala.com.
 Glass items designed by Tapio Wirkkala at Finnish glass fan site designlasi.com.

1915 births
1985 deaths
People from Hanko
Currency designers
Chartered designers
Finnish designers
Finnish interior designers
Aalto University School of Arts, Design and Architecture alumni
Academic staff of the Aalto University School of Arts, Design and Architecture
Recipients of the Order of the Lion of Finland
Recipients of the Prince Eugen Medal
20th-century Finnish sculptors